The following is a list of notable extant historical maps.

Early world maps

Babylonian Map of the World (flat-earth diagram on a clay tablet, c. 600 BC)
Tabula Rogeriana (1154)
Psalter world map (1260)
Tabula Peutingeriana (1265, medieval map of the Roman Empire, believed to be based on 4th century source material)
Hereford Mappa Mundi (c. 1285; the largest medieval map known still to exist)
Map of Maximus Planudes (c. 1300), earliest extant realization of Ptolemy's world map (2nd century)
Gangnido (Korea, 1402)
Bianco world map (1436)
Fra Mauro map (c. 1450)
Map of Bartolomeo Pareto (1455)
Genoese map (1457)
Map of Juan de la Cosa (1500)
Cantino planisphere (1502)
Piri Reis map (1513)
Dieppe maps (c. 1540s-1560s)
Mercator 1569 world map
Theatrum Orbis Terrarum (Ortelius, Netherlands, 1570–1612)
Kunyu Wanguo Quantu (1602)

Notable atlases

Atlas Maior (Blaeu, Netherlands, 1635–1658)
Klencke Atlas (1660)
Atlas Maior (Blaeu, Netherlands, 1662–1667)
Cary's New and Correct English Atlas (London, 1787)
Andrees Allgemeiner Handatlas (Germany, 1881–1939; in the UK as Times Atlas of the World, 1895)
Times Atlas of the World (United Kingdom, 1895)
Rand McNally Atlas (United States, 1881–present)
Stielers Handatlas (Germany, 1817–1944)
Atlante Internazionale del Touring Club Italiano (Italy, 1927)
Atlas Mira (Soviet Union/Russia, 1937)

Early regional maps
Ancient Egypt
Turin Papyrus Map (c. 1150 BC)
Cartography of Europe
Carta Pisana (13th century)
Corbitis Atlas (late 14th century collection of portolan charts)
Early Chinese cartography
Da Ming Hunyi Tu (late 14th century Ming dynasty Chinese map)
Maps of Russia
Godunov map (1667)
Maps of Scandinavia
Carta marina (c. 1530)
Det Kongelige danske Søkortarkiv (1784)
French cartography:
Cassini maps (1756–1789)
Cartography of India
Survey of India (1767)
Great Trigonometrical Survey (1802–1858)
Maps of Korea
Haedong Samgukdo
Cartography of Switzerland
Dufour Map  (1863)
Siegfried Map (1895–1926)
Cartography of the United States
Americae Sive Quartae Orbis Partis Nova Et Exactissima Descriptio (1562)
New and Correct Map of the United States of North America Abel Buell (1784)
Samuel Augustus Mitchell (1867)
United States Geological Survey, National Program for Topographic Mapping (1884)
War of the Rebellion Atlas (1895)
Maps of the United Kingdom
The Brittania (John Ogilby, 1670–1676)
Principal Triangulation of Great Britain (1784–1853)

See also

History of cartography

historical maps
maps